The South Australian Museum is a natural history museum and research institution in Adelaide, South Australia, founded in 1856 and owned by the Government of South Australia. It occupies a complex of buildings on North Terrace in the cultural precinct of the Adelaide Parklands. Plans are under way to move much of its Australian Aboriginal cultural collection (the largest in the world), into a new National Gallery for Aboriginal Art and Cultures.

History

19th century

There had been earlier attempts at setting up mechanics' institutes in the colony, but they struggled to find buildings which could hold their library collections and provide spaces for lectures and entertainments. In 1856, the colonial government promised support for all institutes, in the form of provision the first government-funded purpose-built cultural institution building. The South Australian Institute, incorporating a public library and a museum, was established in 1861 in the rented premises of the Library and Mechanics' Institute in King William Street while awaiting construction of the Institute building on the corner of North Terrace and Kintore Avenue.

In June 1856 the South Australian Legislative Council passed Act No. 16 of 1855–6, the South Australian Institute Act (An Act to establish and incorporate an Institution to be called the South Australian Institute), which incorporated the South Australian Institute under the control of a Board of Governors, to whose ownership all materials belonging to the old Library and Mechanics' Institute was immediately transferred.  The Act provided for a library and a museum as part of the new organisation.

Frederick George Waterhouse offered his services as curator of the South Australian Institute Museum in June 1859 in an honorary capacity. When the Institute building was completed, the Board appointed him as the first curator, a position he held until his retirement in February 1882. He was succeeded by Wilhelm Haacke, who in January 1883 recommended the South Australian Institute Museum be renamed the South Australian Museum (which did not happen then), and the position of Curator be changed to Director. Haacke was appointed the first Director, but only held the position until he resigned in October 1884 after a series of disputes with the Museum's management

20th century
The Museum Act (1939) gave the South Australian Museum autonomy from the Art Gallery and Library, and the South Australian Institute Museum was officially renamed the South Australian Museum. This legislation was superseded by the South Australian Museum Act (1976). At some point between 1996 and 2002, the Museum became part of Arts SA.

In 1997, championed by state Arts Minister Diana Laidlaw, the SA Museum was funded to develop its ground floor Australian Aboriginal Cultures Gallery.

21st century

The following decade, Mike Rann, Premier and Arts Minister from 2002 to 2011, funded the redevelopment of the Pacific Cultures Gallery and the development of the South Australian Biodiversity Gallery. In October 2005, a piece of public art incorporating water, 14 Pieces, situated on the forecourt of the museum, was officially unveiled by the Premier. Created by artists Angela and Hossein Valamanesh and commissioned by the City of Adelaide, it replaced the Lavington Bonython fountain that had occupied the site from 1965. Its form is based on the vertebrae of an extinct marine reptile, the ichthyosaur.

In 2011 Mr Rann appointed former Adelaide Lord Mayor and Education Minister Jane Lomax-Smith AM as chair of the Museum Board.

In November 2020 Mr Kim Cheater was appointed as Chair of the Museum Board.

Management and governance
The official role of the museum, as per the 2017/8 annual report, is:

Its vision is to "...use [its] world-class collections to create and share new knowledge, focusing on Australian Aboriginal and Pacific cultures, Earth and Life Sciences".

The Director is  Brian Oldman (appointed December 2013).

As a statutory corporation, management of the museum is prescribed under the South Australian Museum Act 1976 and State and Federal Government regulations. The museum was a division of Arts South Australia (previously Arts SA) within the Department of State Development until 2018. After the election of the Marshall government in March 2018, the Arts Ministry was removed, Arts SA was dismantled and its functions were transferred to direct oversight by the Department of the Premier and Cabinet.

The Board of eight people appointed by the Minister, chaired by Mr Kim Cheater, oversees the management of the Museum.

New Aboriginal cultural centre
The South Australian government is committed to splitting the Museum, retaining a natural history museum on its existing site and creating a new gallery for Aboriginal art and culture on the site of the old Royal Adelaide Hospital, now known as Lot Fourteen. In early 2019 a consultation process was begun, involving the state government, the Museum, the Art Gallery of South Australia, the State Library, Tandanya National Aboriginal Cultural Institute and South Australia's Aboriginal communities, in particular the Kaurna.

An update on the Lot Fourteen gallery was announced by Premier Steven Marshall in February 2020, with a scheduled completion date of 2023.

Collections
The museum houses over four million objects and specimens. Permanent galleries include:

 Ancient Egypt
 Australian Aboriginal Cultures
 Australian Polar Collection
 Ediacaran Fossils
 Megafauna
 Minerals and Meteorites
 Opal Fossils, including gembones
 Pacific Cultures
 South Australian Biodiversity
 Whales and Dolphins
 World Mammals

Indigenous artefacts collection
The museum contains the most significant collection of Australian Aboriginal cultural artefacts in the world, housing about 30,000 objects. This collection, along with several others in the museum, is being digitised, with many images and a great deal of data about each item now available for online browsing.

In 2016, a private benefactor, Margaret Davy AM, provided funding for a new position for an Indigenous curator for five years, which she requested be named in honour of her late husband, William Geary. This position is known as The William and Margaret Geary Curator of Aboriginal and Torres Strait Islander Art and Material Culture, with the first appointee being Glenn Iseger-Pilkington, a Wadjarri, Nhanda and Nyoongar man from Western Australia with a background in art curating. This was the first time in the history of the museum that a lead curatorial role had been designated for an Indigenous person, and it is hoped that the collection will be developed in a way informed by Indigenous voices and worldview, and also help to make it, in the words of Iseger-Pilkington, "more relevant and accessible to Aboriginal and Torres Strait Islander communities".

The museum holds the biggest collection of carvings by Arrernte artist and anthropological interpreter Erlikilyika, also known as Jim Kite, who lived at the tiny and remote European settlement at Charlotte Waters telegraph station. It also holds a bound sketchbook of 24 pencil drawings of native trees, created during the Spencer and Gillen expedition and bought by Herbert Basedow before being acquired by the Museum, as well as photographs of "Jimmy Kite" and other related materials.

Repatriation of human remains

A new museum policy has committed to the repatriation of returning the ancestral remains of about 4600 Old People, currently held in storage at the museum, to Country. Some of the remains now being returned from overseas institutions were "collected" by men like former Museum Director Edward C. Stirling, University of Adelaide Professor Archibald Watson and physician and city coroner William Ramsay Smith (who also bought remains stolen from burial grounds at Hindmarsh Island). However these numbers are small when compared with the vast majority of the remains, which were disturbed by land clearing, construction projects or members of the public.

An Aboriginal heritage and repatriation manager, Anna Russo, was appointed in 2018 as part of a wider restructure to make repatriation and Aboriginal agency a priority for the museum. Kaurna elder Jeffrey Newchurch had been lobbying the museum for years, and SAM Head of Humanities John Carty said the Museum was one of the last cultural institutions in Australia to return ownership and management of ancestral remains to Aboriginal people.

On 1 August 2019, the remains of 11 Kaurna people were laid to rest at a ceremony led by Newchurch at Kingston Park Coastal Reserve. Carty said the museum was "passionate" about working with the Kaurna people to repatriate their ancestors, and would also be helping to educate the community about what it means to Aboriginal people. The Museum continues to receive further remains, and together with the community would need to find a good solution to accommodate the many remains of Old People, such as a memorial park.

Notable exhibitions
Waterhouse Art Prize exhibitions. The annual Waterhouse Natural Science Art Prize, the richest prize for natural science art in Australia and named after the museum's first curator, has been awarded in most years since 2003. Exhibitions of the work submitted for the prizes are held at the Museum.
Traversing Antarctica: the Australian Experience (December 2013 – March 2014). Rare artefacts and displays highlighting the scientific, historical, and cultural legacy of Australia's interactions with Antarctica.
Shimmer (October–November 2015). A collaborative exhibition with between JamFactory, the South Australian Museum and Tarnanthi, a national event held annually by the Art Gallery of South Australia to showcase Indigenous art and culture.
Ngurra: Home in the Ngaanyatjarra Lands (October 2017 – January 2018) Ngurra is a word with complex connotations, meaning home, country, camp, birthplace and belonging. Showed the creativity and ingenuity of the Ngaanyatjarra people of Western Australia in all aspects of their life and art. Curated by Glenn Iseger-Pilkington.
"Yurtu Ardla" (March–June 2019). Yurtu Ardla means wood in the Nukunu and Adnyamathanha languages. The exhibition, curated by Jared Thomas, is a continuation of the Ku Arts workshop series in 2015, which consisted of carving camps by Nukunu (of the Southern Flinders Ranges) and Adnyamathanha (of the Northern Flinders and Gammon Ranges) and which revitalised the Nukunu carving practices. Before this exhibition, there were fewer than 20 known Nukunu objects held by the Museum, mostly made by Nukunu man Paddy Thompson and acquired by anthropologist Norman Tindale in the 1920s. The specially commissioned piti (coolamon), thiparra (shields), wadna (boomerangs), yakadi (walking sticks) and wirri (clubs) have added to the historic items to illustrate the continuation of the tradition. Roy Coulthard is a third-generation carver in his family, who visits schools to share his knowledge. With this exhibition, SAM is adopting the practice of naming artists and identifying works for their individual artistry rather than their ethnic identity.

People associated with the Museum

Historical
 Edgar Ravenswood Waite, zoologist, ichthyologist, herpetologist, and ornithologist, Director of the SA Museum 1914–1928.
 Amandus Heinrich Christian Zietz, zoologist, assistant director of the SA Museum 1900–1910.

Contemporary
Philip Jones, senior curator, historian and award-winning author
 Jared Thomas, Nukunu man and award-winning children's fiction author, playwright and poet, is the William and Margaret Geary Curator of Aboriginal and Torres Strait Islander Art and Material Culture (from May 2018 and ). He is also Ambassador of the Indigenous Literacy Foundation, member of the Australia Council for the Arts Aboriginal and Torres Strait Islander Strategy Panel.

Partnerships and corporate sponsorships
Partnerships and sponsorships help the museum facilitate events, conduct research and develop exhibits.

Public sector partners have included the University of Adelaide, University of South Australia, Flinders University, the Botanic Gardens of South Australia, CSIRO and SARDI. The museum also collaborates with national and international universities.

Corporate partners have included the Adelaide Festival, the Adelaide Festival of Ideas, the Adelaide Film Festival, Australian Geographic, BHP, Beach Energy, Newmont and Santos

Gallery

Opal fossils at the South Australian Museum

See also
 List of museums in South Australia

References and notes

Further reading

External links
 South Australian Museum website

Museums in Adelaide
Natural history museums in Australia
Fossil museums
1847 establishments in Australia
Adelaide Park Lands
Ethnographic museums in Australasia